Verkh-Syra is a rural locality (a village) in Lobanovskoye Rural Settlement, Permsky District, Perm Krai, Russia. The population was 1 as of 2010. There is 1 street.

Geography 
Verkh-Syra is located on the Syra River, 26 km southeast of Perm (the district's administrative centre) by road. Merkushevo is the nearest rural locality.

References 

Rural localities in Permsky District